The 1991–92 season was the 46th season in Rijeka’s history. It was their 1st season in the Prva HNL and 18th successive top tier season.

In autumn 1991, Rijeka was played only friendly matches, as the domestic competitions were postponed to the spring 1992 due to the Croatian War of Independence.

Competitions

Prva HNL

Classification

Results summary

Results by round

Matches

Prva HNL

Source: HRnogomet.com

Croatian Cup

Source: HRnogomet.com

Squad statistics
Competitive matches only.  Appearances in brackets indicate numbers of times the player came on as a substitute.

See also
1992 Prva HNL
1992 Croatian Cup

Notes
1. The game was abandoned in the 76th minute as Rijeka players protested the referee’s decision to award Inter the penalty kick. At the time, Rijeka was leading 1–0. The match was voided and awarded 3–0 to Inker.

References

External sources
 1992 Prva HNL at HRnogomet.com
 1992 Croatian Cup at HRnogomet.com 
 Prvenstvo 1992. at nk-rijeka.hr

HNK Rijeka seasons
Rijeka
Rijeka